General elections were held in Liechtenstein in April and May 1898.

Electors 
Electors were selected through elections that were held between 28 April and 3 May. Each municipality had two electors for every 100 inhabitants.

Results 
The election of Oberland's Landtag members and substitutes was held on 11 May in Vaduz. Of Oberland's 118 electors, 117 were present. Oberland elected seven Landtag members and four substitutes.

The election of Unterland's Landtag members and substitutes was held on 12 May in Mauren. All of Unterland's 74 electors were present. Unterland elected five Landtag members and one substitute.

Xaver Bargetze did not accept his election as one of Oberland's Landtag members and was replaced by Meinrad Ospelt. Franz Josef Biedermann did not accept his election as one of Oberland's substitutes.

References 

Liechtenstein
1898 in Liechtenstein
Elections in Liechtenstein
May 1898 events